Suada swerga, the Grass bob, is a butterfly belonging to the family Hesperiidae.

Subspecies
 S. s. swerga de Niceville, [1884]
 S. s. triplex (Plötz, 1884)

References

Natural History Museum Lepidoptera genus database
Suada de Nicéville, 1895  at Markku Savela's Lepidoptera and Some Other Life Forms

Hesperiinae